The 1998–99 Liverpool F.C. season was the 107th season in the club's existence, and their 37th consecutive year in the top-flight of English football. In addition to the Premier League, the club also competed in the FA Cup, League Cup, and the UEFA Cup.

This season covered the period of 1 July 1998 to 30 June 1999.

Season overview
The appointment of former France national team head coach Gérard Houllier as joint manager alongside Roy Evans was seen as Liverpool's best chance of making a title challenge, but Evans did not enjoy the partnership and resigned in November to leave Houllier in sole charge.

Despite Michael Owen's brilliant form, Liverpool were unable to mount anything like a title challenge and seemed to be a side in transition following the appointment of their new head coach and adapting to a new style, which saw new signing Rigobert Song arrive and the likes of Jason McAteer and Rob Jones leave, along with the club's longest serving player Steve Harkness, who joined Benfica on 7 March 1999 after almost ten years at Anfield.

By January, the side was reshuffled but the failure of the club to retain the services of Steve McManaman, transferred to Real Madrid at the end of the season in a deal labelled as the Bosman scandal of the season, hurt the club financially. Performance wise, their seventh-place finish was not enough to attain even a UEFA Cup place, as well as being the club's lowest finish in five years.

The season had not started poorly, with a 2–1 win at Southampton followed by a 0–0 draw at home to the previous season's double winners Arsenal and an impressive 4–1 away win over Newcastle United just days after the Tynesiders had sacked former Liverpool boss Kenny Dalglish. September began with a 2–0 win over Coventry City which saw the Reds top the table after four matches, level on points with Aston Villa, while title favourites Arsenal and Manchester United were fifth and ninth respectively.

However, Liverpool's lead of the Premier League was lost in their fifth match after they lost 2–1 at West Ham United. They travelled to Old Trafford for an encounter with fierce rivals Manchester United on 24 September, but lost 2–0. They were now fourth in the league, while United were third, unfancied Derby County were second and Aston Villa now led the league.

15 September saw the beginning of the club's UEFA Cup campaign, where they defeated Slovakian side Košice 3–0 away in Košice. A comprehensive 5–0 win in the second leg booked Liverpool's place in the next round.

October was a mixed month for the Reds, who crushed Nottingham Forest 5–1 in the Premier League at Anfield but were held to draws by Chelsea and Everton and ended the month with a 1–0 defeat at Leicester City which saw them still restricted to fourth place. However, they were now six points behind leaders Aston Villa – who had a game in hand – and more than a quarter of the league season had now passed. Manchester United were now one point off the top, while Arsenal had re-emerged as contenders for the title they had won the previous season, now occupying third place. Derby County's challenge had fallen away as they slipped to mid-table.

There was positive news on the European scene that late autumn as they edged past Valencia on away goals in the UEFA Cup second round.

Liverpool's League Cup quest began well with a 3–1 home win over Division Two leaders Fulham in the third round, but ended in the next round with a 3–1 home defeat to a Tottenham Hotspur side who were recovering well from their dismal start to the season since the appointment of George Graham as manager. The first half of November was a disaster for the Reds, who lost at home to both Derby County and Leeds United. However, the month ended on a higher note as wins over Aston Villa and Blackburn Rovers lifted them back up to eighth place.

Liverpool's dreams of European glory were ended on 8 December 1998 when they suffered a hefty defeat to Celta Vigo in the UEFA Cup third round. The Reds had stuttered in the league early in the month and a 1–0 defeat at Wimbledon on 13 December saw them occupy 12th place in the league. However, three straight wins saw them rise to seventh by the end of the year.

By the dawn of the new year, Liverpool's last hope of silverware was in the FA Cup. They had an easy start in the competition, travelling to Vale Park for a third round tie with Division One strugglers Port Vale, coming away 3–0 winners. However, their hopes of glory ended in the fourth round when they surrendered a 1–0 lead in the dying minutes to lose 2–1 to Manchester United at Old Trafford. Their dismal league form that month saw them draw 0–0 at Arsenal and lose 2–1 at Coventry City, though they had some wry consolation in the form of a 7–1 hammering of strugglers Southampton at Anfield, in a match that saw Robbie Fowler score his 100th Premier League goal. They were now sixth in the league, now being led by Chelsea, who were eight points ahead of them with a game in hand.

Spring brought a similar pattern of results, and by 21 April, they had slid down to tenth place in the league with even their UEFA Cup qualification hopes looking slim. They needed a good run of results to even finish eighth, the lowest position they had finished in since their current spell as a top flight club began in 1962.

Wins over Blackburn and Tottenham kept the Reds in contention for European qualification with three matches to play, but a draw at home to Manchester United and a defeat at Sheffield Wednesday meant a 3–0 home win over Wimbledon on the final day of the season was not enough for anything higher than seventh place, meaning the 1999–2000 season would be Liverpool's first season in five years without European football.

Players

First-team squad
Squad at end of season

Left club during season

Reserves

Results

Pre-season and friendlies

Premier League

League table

Results summary

Results by round

Matches

FA Cup

League Cup

UEFA Cup

First round

Second round

Third round

Statistics

Appearances and Goals

|-
! colspan=14 style=background:#dcdcdc; text-align:center| Goalkeepers

|-
! colspan=14 style=background:#dcdcdc; text-align:center| Defenders

|-
! colspan=14 style=background:#dcdcdc; text-align:center| Midfielders

|-
! colspan=14 style=background:#dcdcdc; text-align:center| Forwards

|-
! colspan=14 style=background:#dcdcdc; text-align:center| Players transferred out during the season

Goal scorers

Competition top scorers

Notes

References

External links
1998–99 Liverpool F.C. season at LFC History

Liverpool F.C. seasons
Liverpool